Jacqueline Picasso or Jacqueline Roque (24 February 1927 – 15 October 1986) was the muse and second wife of Pablo Picasso. Their marriage lasted 12 years until his death, during which time he created over 400 portraits of her, more than any of Picasso's other lovers.

Early life
Born in 1927 in Paris, France, she was only two when her father abandoned her mother and her five-year-old brother. Her mother raised her in cramped concierge's quarters near the Champs Elysées, while also working long hours as a seamstress. Jacqueline was 18 when her mother died of a stroke. In 1946, Jacqueline married André Hutin, an engineer, with whom she had a daughter, Catherine Hutin-Blay. The young family moved to Africa, where Hutin worked, but four years later Jacqueline divorced Hutin and returned to France with Cathy in 1952. She settled down on the French Riviera and took a job at her cousin's shop, the Madoura Pottery in Vallauris.

Relationship with Picasso
Pablo Picasso met Roque in the summer of 1952 while she was working at the Madoura Pottery. At the age of 25, she had taken the role of salesperson in the company's store and was located near to the entrance, where Picasso easily noticed her. He romanced her by drawing a dove on her house in chalk and bringing her one rose a day until she agreed to date him. 

Françoise Gilot, Picasso's partner at the time, broke off their relationship at the end of September 1953 and left for Paris with their two children. Gilot recalled that when she visited him in July 1954, Picasso continued to live alone, but Roque visited him almost every day. She had been living with her daughter Cathy at a villa at Golfe-Juan named Le Ziquet. According to Picasso's biographer John Richardson, the majority of Picasso's friends disapproved of Roque, while he developed a rapport with her and considered her to be an excellent match for Picasso due to her "submissive and supportive" temperament and the fact that she was "obsessively in love with him". 

In the summer of 1954, Picasso went to stay at the large home of Comte Jacques de Lazarme in Perpignan. He arrived there on 6 August with his daughter Maya and his other two children Claude and Paloma. There they were joined by Douglas Cooper, John Richardson, and later Roland Penrose. Roque and her daughter Cathy also joined the group, but had to stay in a local hotel. When Maya left near the end of August, Roque was allowed to stay in Picasso's room. Two nights later, Picasso and Roque had a huge argument. Patrick O'Brian, a friend of the Lazermes’, recalled that the next morning Roque left to drive to Golfe-Juan, but would stop every hour to speak to Picasso. By the time she reached Béziers, Roque was suicidal. She returned that evening but the argument created a rift between them. O'Brian recalled, "During the next weeks Picasso's attitude towards her was embarrassingly disagreeable, while hers was embarrassingly submissive—she referred to him as her God, spoke to him in the third person and frequently kissed his hands". Richardson opined, "Picasso was testing the limits of Jacqueline's masochistic devotion. This time around, he could not afford another abortive romance. It was up to Jacqueline to prove by the sheer force of her love that she was the best candidate for his hand".

In October 1954, Picasso and Roque began to live together, when she was aged 27 and he was 72. Upon returning to her home in Golfe-Juan, Roque and Picasso found the villa to be too small and moved to Paris. Three days before completing the series of paintings Les Femmes d'Algier, Picasso's estranged wife Olga Khokhlova died, causing Roque and Picasso to return to Cannes. The couple found a private retreat at the Villa La Californie near Mougins. By the end of 1957, Picasso was searching for a new home due to the rise of nearby developments, and bought Château of Vauvenargues in 1958. They married in Vallauris on 2 March 1961. To celebrate their marriage, the couple moved to a villa named Notre-Dame-de-Vie, situated on a hillside near Mougins, where Picasso spent his final 12 years.

Picasso's muse 
Roque's image began to appear in Picasso's paintings in 1954. These portraits are characterized by an exaggerated neck and feline face, distortions of Roque's features. Eventually her dark eyes and eyebrows, high cheekbones, and classical profile would become familiar symbols in his late paintings. 

Picasso made the first portrait of his second wife on 2 June 1954. It was exhibited at the Maison de la Pensée Français in Paris in July as  Portrait de Madame Z, which was inspired by the name of Jacqueline’s house Le Ziquet. A second portrait of Jacqueline seated was completed on 3 June.

It is likely that Picasso's series of paintings Les Femmes d'Alger, derived from Eugène Delacroix's The Women of Algiers was inspired by Roque's beauty; the artist commented that "Delacroix had already met Jacqueline." John Richardson commented, "Françoise had not been the Delacroix type. Jacqueline, on the contrary, epitomized it... And then, there is the African connection: Jacqueline had lived for many years as the wife of a colonial official [Hutin] in Upper Volta. As Picasso remarked, 'Ouagadougou may not be Algiers, nonetheless Jacqueline has an African provenance'". 

On 28 December 1955, he created Jacqueline with a scarf, a lino cut of Jacqueline as "Lola de Valence", which was a reference to Édouard Manet's 1862 painting of the Spanish dancer. In 1963 he painted her portrait 160 times, and continued to paint her, in increasingly abstracted forms, until 1972.

Later life 
Roque was devoted to Picasso throughout their marriage and when he died in 1973, she was deeply affected by grief. Art critic, Richard Dorment stated, "she would sit in a darkened room, sobbing, or address a photograph of her husband as though he were still alive". Richardson observed that whenever he visited Roque after the death of Picasso, she would be utterly distraught, often requiring a doctor to administer tranquillisers. In 1980, her condition seemed to improve and she flew to New York for a Picasso retrospective at the Museum of Modern Art. Richardson noted that during his visit to Notre-Dame-de-Vie in 1984 or 1985, she seemed more tormented, often declaring, "Pablo is not dead".

After Picasso's death, Jacqueline prevented his children Claude and Paloma Picasso from attending his funeral. Jacqueline also barred Picasso's grandson Pablito Picasso (son of Paolo, Picasso's son from his marriage to the Russian dancer Olga Khokhlova) from attending the service. Pablito was so distraught he drank a bottle of bleach, dying three months later.

Françoise Gilot, Picasso's companion between 1943 and 1953, and mother of two of his children, Claude and Paloma, fought with Jacqueline over the distribution of the artist's estate. Gilot and her children had unsuccessfully contested the will on the grounds that Picasso was mentally ill. 

After the legal battles and death of Picasso's son Paolo Picasso, a French court ruled that the inheritors to the Picasso estate were Jacqueline, his children and grandchildren: Claude, Paloma, Maya, Bernard and Marina Picasso.

Eventually Claude, Paloma and Jacqueline agreed to establish the Musée Picasso in Paris.

Death
Jacqueline Picasso never recovered from the death of her husband. She had been frequenting Picasso's grave on the eighth of every month and said that he wanted her to join him. She shot herself on 15 October 1986 in their Mougins home, the chateau where they had spent their married life together; she was 59 years old. She was buried with her husband on the terrace outside the Château of Vauvenargues. Shortly before her death she had confirmed that she would be present at an upcoming exhibit of her private collection of Picasso's work in Spain.

Legacy 
Picasso created more portraits of his second wife than any other woman in his life. John Richardson, Picasso's biographer, described Picasso's final years before his death as "L'Époque Jacqueline". Arne Glimcher, founder of the Pace Gallery commented, "The range of interpretation of her image is quite extraordinary [...] you see the transformation of his late style only through these portraits of Jacqueline."

See also 

 Femme au Chien, a 1962 portrait of Roque by Picasso

Notes

References
 DuPont, Pepita (2007). La vérité sur Jacqueline et Pablo Picasso [The Truth about Jacqueline and Pablo Picasso]. Paris: Cherche midi
 Hohenadel, Kristin (21 March 2004). "Mixing art and commerce." The Los Angeles Times
 Huffington, Arianna Stassinopoulos (1988). Picasso: Creator and Destroyer. New York: Simon & Schuster
 Johns, Cathy (2001). "Roque, Jacqueline." (pp. 458-462). In: Jill Berk Jiminez (Ed.) & Joanna Banham (Assoc. Ed.). Dictionary of Artists' Models. Chicago: Fitzroy Dearborn. 
 Richardson, John (2001). The Sorcerer's Apprentice: Picasso, Provence, and Douglas Cooper. Chicago: University of Chicago Press. 

1927 births
1986 deaths
1986 suicides
French artists' models
Suicides by firearm in France
Muses
Pablo Picasso